Ladela Schools (LS) is a private school located in the Wuse II district of Abuja, the capital of Nigeria. The school offers nursery, primary and secondary level education.

History
Established on 6 September 2004, Ladela Schools commenced classes officially on Monday, 13 September 2004.

References

Schools in Abuja
Educational institutions established in 2004
2004 establishments in Nigeria